Viktor Anatolievich Gushan  is a Moldovan-Russian businessman and former KGB officer.

Biography
Gushan was born on September 9, 1962. He was a KGB officer, where, according to some sources, he was known as the "Sheriff". According to other sources, he was a combatant in the Transnistria war, fighting on the side of the separatists and contributing to the arrest of members of the Ilașcu group.

In 1993, together with Ilya Kazmaly, he founded the Sheriff holding company, inspired either from his nickname or from his interests toward the Wild West police force of the United States during the 19th century. Since March 2012, Gushan has full control of the company and is its chairman. Initially, the company was active in the cigarette and alcohol trade, and subsequently expanded to other areas. Sheriff holds a monopoly on trade, oil, telecommunications and Transnistrian media. In 2021, the company controlled about 60% of the economy of Transnistria.

Gushan is one of the richest people in post-Soviet space, with his fortune estimated at $2 billion. Besides Russia and Moldova (especially Transnistria), Gushan also has business in Ukraine, Cyprus and Germany. he also owns properties in the Odesa Oblast of Ukraine. Following Russia's annexation of Crimea, Gushan expanded his business to this region.

The success of Sheriff was facilitated by former Transnistrian president Igor Smirnov, who exempted the company from paying customs duties. The company supports the political party Obnovlenie, which has held power in the Transnistria for years. During his tenure as President of Transnistria, Yevgeny Shevchuk criticized the Sheriff monopoly and accused Gushan of being involved in various criminal activities. After completing his mandate, Shevchuk fled Transnistria, accusing Gushan of trying to assassinate him. Following the 2020 elections, Obnovlenie is the only party present in the Supreme Soviet of the Transnistria, thus concentrating all power in Gushan's hands. For these reasons, Gushan is considered an oligarch, or even the shadow leader of Transnistria.
He is also the president of FC Sheriff.

References 

1962 births
Living people
Transnistrian people of Moldovan descent
Moldovan businesspeople
Moldovan company founders
Moldovan sports businesspeople
Russian billionaires
Russian people of Moldovan descent
Ukrainian people of Moldovan descent
Ukrainian billionaires
KGB officers
FC Sheriff Tiraspol non-playing staff